Wonga Park is a locality on the edge of Greater Melbourne, beyond the Melbourne Metropolitan Urban Growth Boundary area, 28 km north-east from Melbourne's Central Business District, located within the Cities of Manningham and Maroondah and the Shire of Yarra Ranges local government areas.

Wonga Park is bounded in the west by Jumping Creek, in the north by the Yarra River, in the east by Brushy Park and Old Homestead Roads and in the south by Holloway Road.

The name comes from the Wonga Park grazing property, which itself derives from Simon Wonga, elder of the Wurundjeri indigenous people of Melbourne. The area was part of Mooroolbark until the 1890s.

History
Eight Hour Pioneer Settlement Post Office opened in 1902, was renamed Wonga Park around 1907 and closed in 1989. It reopened in its current location in 1994.

One of the grazing properties, Yarra Brae, was acquired by the Lord Clifford in 1942. He made part of it available for Australia's first Pan Pacific Scout Jamboree in 1948. Clifford Park hosted another Jamboree in 1955 and is now a major Scout campsite, available for use by non-Scouting organisations as well.

In 1972, Yarra Brae was the site of a proposed Lower Yarra River Reservoir, but residents of the nearby Bend of Isles bushland estate persuaded the Victorian Government to abandon the proposal.

The residential development of Wonga Park came after the subdivisions in Croydon and Mooroolbark, which were on the Maroondah Highway and a railway line. Residential living is most concentrated around the old village settlement where the church, hall, sports facilities, fire station and local shops are found.

The northern boundary of Wonga Park, where land was acquired for the Yarra Brae storage, is a linear riverside part of the Warrandyte State Park. Wonga Park is also home to the largest residential block of land within metropolitan Melbourne, with many of the residential blocks being large in size, creating a private sanctuary for many of its residents. John Farnham resides in Wonga Park, as does V8 Supercar driver Garth Tander.

Local Services and Shopping Village
Wonga Park shopping village used to have a number of shops including a newsagent, bakery, supermarket, hairdresser and fish & chip takeaway. As at September 2021, the shopping village is being refurbished and is expected to open in late 2022.

An IGA supermarket and Saam Saii Thai restaurant are located on Jumping Creek Rd, Wonga Park.

A general store with fuel and a post office are located in Wonga Park.

Wonga Park is served by Country Fire Authority (CFA) volunteers.

Activities
Wonga Park is a scenic town with bushland and farm views. Bushwalking and river activities are available.

Wonga Park has a tennis club, a cricket club, a golf course, a soccer club (Wonga Wizards FC) and numerous horse riding clubs. With the Yarra River being so close, canoeing is also a popular activity. The Clifford Park Scout Camp is also located in Wonga Park.

Wonga Park hosts a farmers' market on the fourth Saturday of the month. It offers local foods and produce, craft, plants, music and children’s activities. The market is held at the Wonga Park Primary School.

The Kellybrook Winery is an established Yarra Valley winery located on Fulford Rd Wonga Park. It has a cellar door for wine tastings, occasional live music and an annual cider festival in autumn.

See also
 Shire of Lillydale – Wonga Park was previously within this former local government area.

References

City of Manningham
City of Maroondah
Yarra Ranges